Jean Campbell (December 30, 1928 – August 18, 2004) was a catcher who played in the All-American Girls Professional Baseball League. Campbell batted and threw right handed. She was born in Syracuse, New York.

Notes
 Little is known about this player. Campbell appears as a member of the Fort Wayne Daisies club during its 1946 season. Campbell did not have individual records or some information was incomplete.

 Campbell  is part of the AAGPBL permanent display at the Baseball Hall of Fame and Museum at Cooperstown, New York opened in 1988, which is dedicated to the entire league rather than any individual figure.

Sources

All-American Girls Professional Baseball League players
Fort Wayne Daisies players
Baseball players from Syracuse, New York
1928 births
2004 deaths